Arachidonate 15-lipoxygenase type II is an enzyme that in humans is encoded by the ALOX15B gene.  ALOX15B, also known as 15-lipoxygenase-2 (15-LO-2 or 15-LOX-2), is distinguished from its related oxygenase, ALOX15 or 15-lipoxygenase-1.

Function 

This gene encodes a member of the lipoxygenase family of structurally related nonheme iron dioxygenases involved in the production of fatty acid hydroperoxides. 15-LOX-2 has 38-39% amino acid sequence identity to human 15-LOX-1 and 12-lipoxygenase and 44% amino acid sequence identity to human 5-lipoxygenase.  15-LOX-2 converts arachidonic acid almost exclusively to the S stereoisomer of 15-Hydroperoxyicosatetraenoic acid which is commonly reduced to the S stereoisomer 15-Hydroxyeicosatetraenoic acid by ubiquitous cellular peroxidases; it metabolizes linoleic acid less effectively, converting this fatty acid to the S stereoisomer of 13-hydroperoxyoctadecadienoic acid which is likewise rapidly reduced to the S stereoisomer of 13-Hydroxyoctadecadienoic acid. The ALOX15B gene is located in a cluster of related genes and a pseudogene that spans approximately 100 kilobases on the short arm of chromosome 17. Alternatively spliced transcript variants encoding different isoforms have been described.

See also 
 Arachidonate 15-lipoxygenase
 15-hydroxyicosatetraenoic acid
 ALOX15

References

External links

Further reading 

 
 
 
 
 
 
 
 
 
 
 
 
 

EC 1.13.11